The National Football League playoffs for the 1973 season began on December 22, 1973. The postseason tournament concluded with the Miami Dolphins defeating the Minnesota Vikings in Super Bowl VIII, 24–7, on January 13, 1974, at Rice Stadium in Houston, Texas.

Like the previous NFL seasons, the home teams in the playoffs were decided based on a yearly divisional rotation, excluding the wild card teams who would always play on the road.

This was the first NFL postseason in which none of the twelve "old guard" NFL teams played in the conference championship games.

Participants

Bracket

Schedule
In the United States, NBC broadcast the AFC playoff games, while CBS televised the NFC games and Super Bowl VIII.

Divisional playoffs

Saturday, December 22, 1973

NFC: Minnesota Vikings 27, Washington Redskins 20

Minnesota scored 17 points in the fourth quarter to overcome a 13-10 deficit, including two touchdowns in a span of 1:05.

Both offenses struggled in the first quarter.  The Vikings were completely unable to move the ball, finishing the quarter without any first downs, while Washington kicker Curt Knight missed two field goal attempts.  One miss was from 49 yards and the other from 17, spoiling an impressive drive that saw the Redskins drive from their own 14 to inside the Vikings 10-yard line.

Minnesota finally managed to get rolling in the second quarter, with a 50-yard completion from Tarkenton to running back Oscar Reed setting up Fred Cox's 19-yard field goal. But with 3:30 left in the half, Vikings cornerback Bobby Bryant fumbled a punt return that was recovered by Redskins running back Bob Brunet on the Minnesota 21-yard line.  Billy Kilmer then completed a 17-yard pass to Charley Taylor before Larry Brown scored on a 3-yard touchdown run to give the Redskins a 7–3 lead. Minnesota responded with a drive into field goal range, but Mike Bass intercepted a pass from Tarkenton to maintain Washington's lead going into halftime.

The Vikings then took the opening kickoff of the second half and marched 79 yards, including a 46-yard run by Reed, to score on fullback Bill Brown's 2-yard rushing touchdown.  To make matters worse for Washington, star cornerback Pat Fischer suffered cracked ribs on the drive and was replaced by Speedy Duncan, an 11-year veteran who normally only played as a kick returner.  Still, the Redskins managed to take back the lead with Knight's two third quarter field goals, first tying a playoff record from 52 yards, and the second from 46 yards on the first play of the fourth quarter.

Now facing a 13-10 fourth quarter deficit, the Vikings stormed back with two quick touchdowns.  First they drove 71 yards in 8 plays to score on Tarkenton's pass to John Gilliam, who beat single coverage by Duncan for a 28-yard touchdown catch.  Then on the first play of Washington's ensuing drive, Nate Wright intercepted a pass from Kilmer and returned it 26 yards to the Redskins 8-yard line, setting up a 6-yard touchdown pass from Tarkenton to Gilliam that made the score 24-13. With 5:28 left, Washington got back to within four points, getting good field position due to Ken Stone blocking a Vikings punt and converting it into Kilmer's 28-yard touchdown pass to Roy Jefferson.  But the Vikings managed to burn up 4 minutes with their ensuing drive, finishing it off with a 30-yard Cox field goal that gave them a 27-20 lead.  The Redskins had less than two minutes to drive for a tying touchdown, and ended up turning the ball over on downs at the Vikings 42-yard line.

Tarkenton completed 16/28 passes for 222 yards and two touchdowns, with 1 interception.  Reed had 17 carries for 95 yards and caught 4 passes for 76.  Brown rushed for 115 yards and a touchdown, while also catching 2 passes for 13 yards.

“Sometimes they’re not concentrating on me,” said Oscar Reed, in reference to his big plays in the game. “Since early in the season they’ve been keying on Chuck Foreman. I’m not the world’s greatest pass catcher or runner, but given a little room, I’ll use what I’ve got.”

This was the first postseason meeting between the Redskins and Vikings.

AFC: Oakland Raiders 33, Pittsburgh Steelers 14

The Raiders outgained Pittsburgh in total yards 361 to 223, forced three turnovers without losing any on their side, and scored 16 unanswered points in the second half to defeat the Steelers.

After forcing the Steelers to punt on the game's opening drive, Oakland drove 82 yards in 16 plays, including a 20-yard burst by running back Marv Hubbard, to go up 7-0 on Hubbard's 1-yard touchdown run.  In the second quarter, Pittsburgh drove into Raiders territory, only to lose the ball when Terry Bradshaw's pass was deflected by Otis Sistrunk into the arms of linebacker Phil Villapiano for an interception.  A 21-yard completion from Ken Stabler to receiver Mike Siani on the ensuing drive set up a 25-yard field goal by George Blanda, increasing the Raiders lead to 10-0 with 8 minutes left in the half.  The Steelers were forced to punt on their next drive, but their defense subsequently forced the Raiders to go three-and-out.  Then safety Glen Edwards returned Ray Guy's 40-yard punt 20 yards to the Oakland 45-yard line.  On the next play, Bradshaw completed a 24-yard pass to running back Preston Pearson.  Bradshaw eventually threw an incomplete pass on third down, but a 15-yard roughing the passer penalty gave the Steelers a first down on the Oakland 7.  Following a 3-yard running play, Bradshaw finished the drive with a 4-yard touchdown toss to Pearson, cutting the score to 10-7 going into halftime.

Oakland dominated the second half with 16 consecutive points.  After Clarence Davis returned the second half kickoff 30 yards to the Raiders 32, a 15-yard roughing the passer penalty against Pittsburgh and a 17-yard completion from Stabler to Hubbard led to Blanda's 31-yard field goal.  The Steelers had to punt on their next drive, and George Atkinson returned the ball 13 yards to the Oakland 43, sparking a drive that ended with another Blanda field goal that gave the Raiders a 16-7 lead.  Pittsburgh seemed primed to respond when Frank Lewis caught a 17-yard reception that put them in Raiders territory, but on the next play, Willie Brown intercepted a pass from Bradshaw and returned it 54 yards for a touchdown.  With the Steelers now facing a 23-7 deficit, the situation continued to unravel as Bradshaw was intercepted again on the next drive, this time by Atkinson, who returned it 8 yards to the Raiders 37.  Oakland running back Charlie Smith then took off on a 40-yard run to the Steelers 22, setting up Blanda's third field goal that gave them a 26-7 lead.

With 9:12 left in the fourth quarter, Pittsburgh got one last chance to get back in the game as Bradshaw's 26-yard touchdown pass to Lewis cut the score to 26-14.  But after a punt from each team, Oakland put the game away, mainly due to Hubbard, who rushed for gains of 16, 15, 9, and 2 yards before finishing the drive with a 1-yard touchdown run, giving the Raiders a 33-14 lead with 14 seconds left on the clock.

Stabler completed 14/17 passes for 142 yards.  Hubbard rushed for 91 yards and two touchdowns, while also catching a 17-yard pass.  Smith added 73 yards rushing and 10 yards receiving.  Bradshaw was held to just 12/25 completions for 167 yards, with 2 touchdowns and 3 interceptions.  Future Hall of Fame running back Franco Harris was held to 29 yards on 10 carries.

This was the second postseason meeting between the Steelers and Raiders, with Pittsburgh winning last year's meeting.

Sunday, December 23, 1973

AFC: Miami Dolphins 34, Cincinnati Bengals 16

The Dolphins outgained Cincinnati in total yards, 400–194, and first downs, 27–11, while also scoring on three of their first four possessions and shutting out the Bengals in the second half. The Dolphins racked up 241 yards on the ground, including 106 from Mercury Morris and 71 from Larry Csonka, while receiver Paul Warfield caught 5 passes for 95 yards and a score.

Miami dominated the game early on, scoring on their opening drive with Bob Griese's 13-yard touchdown pass to Warfield.  Morris racked up 33 rushing yards on the way to Miami's next first quarter touchdown, a 1-yard run by Csonka.  In the second quarter, faced with 3rd and 1 from his own 44, Griese completed a 48-yard bomb to Warfield that set up Morris' 4-yard touchdown run.  Miami's three touchdowns came on drives of 80, 80, and 73 yards, while all Cincinnati could manage in the first 26 minutes of the contest was 24-yard field goal by Horst Muhlmann on their first drive of the game.  Even that drive caused a major setback for the team, as running back Essex Johnson, the team's leading rusher during the season with 997 yards, suffered a game-ending injury after picking up 14 yards on his first carry.

Facing the prospect of going into their locker room with a 21-3 deficit, the Bengals suddenly stormed back with 13 points in the final 3:26 of the second quarter.  First, defensive back Neal Craig intercepted Griese's pass intended for Jim Mandich near the sideline and returned it 45 yards for a touchdown.  Then the Bengals defense forced a punt and got the ball back on their own 33 with less than two minutes left.  It took nearly all of that time for the team to cross midfield, but quarterback Ken Anderson finally got them into scoring range with a 22-yard scramble to the Dolphins 38, where Muhlmann made a 46-yard field goal that cut the score to 21-13.  Now with just 8 seconds left until halftime, Morris fumbled the ensuing kickoff, and Bengals linebacker Jim LeClair recovered on the Dolphins 3-yard line.  On the next play, Muhlmann kicked a 12-yard field goal that sent both teams into their locker rooms with a score of 21-16.

However, Cincinnati's hope of a comeback was quickly crushed in the second half.  On the third play of the third quarter, Anderson tried to connect on a deep pass to tight end Bob Trumpy, but it was intercepted by Dick Anderson, who returned the ball 19 yards to the Bengals 28.  Seven plays later, Miami went up 28-16 with Griese's 7-yard touchdown pass to Mandich.  Dolphins kicker Garo Yepremian put the finishing touches on his team's victory with field goals from 50 and 46 yards.

This was the first postseason meeting between the Bengals and Dolphins.

NFC: Dallas Cowboys 27, Los Angeles Rams 16

The Cowboys avenged a 37–31 regular season loss to L.A. as two Rams turnovers in the first quarter gave the Cowboys a 14–0 lead. Lee Roy Jordan's interception of a John Hadl pass on the first play of the game led to Calvin Hill's 3-yard touchdown run. Mel Renfro then recovered a Lawrence McCutcheon fumble on the L.A. 35-yard line to set up the Cowboys again which later resulted in Roger Staubach's 4-yard touchdown pass to Drew Pearson.

In the second quarter, Toni Fritsch then added a 39-yard field goal to increase Dallas' lead to 17-0.  However, a 40-yard reception by Rams receiver Harold Jackson set up David Ray's 33-yard field goal that made the score 17-3.  Ray would miss three field goals throughout the game, but made two more to cut the score to 17-9 in the fourth quarter.  Then Hill lost a fumble that L.A. converted into Tony Baker's 5-yard touchdown run, making the score 17-16 with 10 minutes left in regulation.

Ever since taking their 17-0 lead in the second quarter, the Cowboys had managed just four first downs and had not crossed midfield, as Staubach faced a relentless pass rush that sacked him seven times (2½ by Jack Youngblood, 2 by Merlin Olsen).  But when faced with third down and long after an Olsen sack on the ensuing drive, Staubach threw a short pass over the middle to Drew Pearson, and as the Rams were about to stop Pearson for a short gain, defensive backs Dave Elmendorf and Steve Preece collided and fell, allowing Pearson to scamper untouched for an 83-yard touchdown that effectively clinched the game. Fritsch added another field goal for the 27–16 final.

This was the first postseason meeting between the Rams and Cowboys.

Conference Championships

Sunday, December 30, 1973

NFC: Minnesota Vikings 27, Dallas Cowboys 10

The Vikings forced 4 interceptions and recovered 2 fumbles in the second half while also holding Dallas to 152 total yards en route to a 27–10 victory over the Cowboys.

With the loss of running back Calvin Hill and defensive tackle Bob Lilly to injuries, Dallas' offense could not get anything going. Minnesota jumped to a 10–0 lead by halftime with a Fred Cox field goal and an 86-yard drive that ended with a 5-yard rushing touchdown by Chuck Foreman.  The touchdown drive included Fran Tarkenton's completions to tight end Stu Voigt for gains of 16 and 7 yards, a 2-yard run by Foreman on 4th down and 1, and a 12-yard scramble by Tarkenton himself.

What followed would be an amazingly sloppy second half in which both teams combined for 10 turnovers.  Three minutes into the third quarter, Dallas quarterback Roger Staubach threw an interception to Bobby Bryant on the Vikings 2-yard line.  But the Cowboys defense forced a punt and Golden Richards returned it 63 yards for a touchdown, cutting the score to 10-7. Tarkenton quickly struck back, throwing a 54-yard touchdown pass to John Gilliam, who managed to outrun single coverage by Cowboys future Hall of Fame defensive back Mel Renfro. Dallas responded with Toni Fritsch's 17-yard field goal which cut the lead to 17–10.

Then a wave of turnovers began.  On the ensuing possession, Dallas got a huge opportunity to score when Charlie Waters forced a fumble from Foreman that safety Cliff Harris recovered on the Minnesota 37.  However, the Vikings took the ball right back when Staubach threw a pass that was deflected into the arms of linebacker Jeff Siemon.  An even better scoring chance awaited the Cowboys at the end of the Vikings' next drive, as Tarkenton threw an interception to Waters on the Minnesota 24.  But Dallas fared no better this time, losing the ball again when Jim Marshall knocked it out of Staubach's hand as he wound up for a pass, and defensive lineman Gary Larsen recovered it.  The offensive futility continued with Minnesota, as their next drive ended with a fumbled handoff exchange between Tarkenton and Foreman that Dallas lineman Larry Cole recovered on the Vikings 47-yard line.

A few plays later, Dallas faced 3rd and 3 with 9 minutes left in the fourth quarter.  Staubach attempted a pass to Bob Hayes near the right sideline, but Bryant intercepted the pass and raced 63 yards for a touchdown that put the Vikings up 24-10.  Then on Dallas' next drive, Staubach tried to connect with Drew Pearson, but a devastating hit by Nate Wright caused the ball to bounce off his hands and into the arms of Jeff Wright, who returned the ball 13 yards to set up Cox's 34-yard game clinching field goal.

Both teams combined for a net total of just 163 passing yards.  Tarkenton completed only 10/21 passes for 133 yards and a touchdown with one interception, while also rushing for 16 yards.  Staubach had one of the worst postseason performances of his career, completing just 10/21 passes for 89 yards and throwing 4 interceptions, though he did rush for 30 yards.  Foreman was the top offensive performer of the day with 76 rushing yards and 4 receptions for 28, while fullback Oscar Reed added 18 carries for 75 yards and an 8-yard catch.

This was the second postseason meeting between the Vikings and Cowboys, with Dallas winning the only previous meeting.

AFC: Miami Dolphins 27, Oakland Raiders 10

Miami threw only six passes during the game, completing just 3 for 34 yards, but gained 266 rushing yards (more than Oakland's total yards for the game) on 53 carries.  Fullback Larry Csonka led the Dolphins to a victory with 117 rushing yards and an AFC playoff record 3 rushing touchdowns.

Miami scored on an opening 64-yard drive when quarterback Bob Griese's 27-yard run set up Csonka's 11-yard rushing touchdown. Csonka scored again late in the second quarter at the end of a 63-yard drive that took more than 8 minutes off the clock, finishing it with a 2-yard touchdown run to make the score 14–0 with 14 seconds left in the half.

Oakland managed to get on the board in the third quarter with a 21-yard George Blanda field goal, but this was quickly countered with a 42-yard Garo Yepremian field goal set up by Charlie Leigh's 53-yard kickoff return. Oakland then drove 78 yards and scored on Ken Stabler's 25-yard touchdown pass to wide receiver Mike Siani, cutting the lead to 17–10. In the fourth quarter, after Griese's 17-yard run on a QB draw set up Yepremian's 26-yard field goal, the Raiders were faced with fourth down and inches on the Dolphins 42 and were forced to "go for it". But running back Marv Hubbard fumbled the ball while trying to get through the line.  The ball bounced into the hands of Stabler, who was tackled for a loss by defensive back Dick Anderson, and the Dolphins used their running game to take time off the clock and set up Csonka's third touchdown to clinch the game.

This was the second postseason meeting between the Raiders and Dolphins, with Oakland winning the only previous meeting.

Super Bowl VIII: Miami Dolphins 24, Minnesota Vikings 7

This was the first Super Bowl meeting between the Vikings and Dolphins.

References

Total Football: The Official Encyclopedia of the National Football League
The Sporting News Complete Super Bowl Book 1995

National Football League playoffs
Playoffs
Los Angeles Rams postseason
NFL playoffs
NFL playoffs